Stav Strashko (born September 24, 1992) is an Israeli model and actress. She is most noted for her performance in the 2018 film Flawless, for which she became the first openly transgender actress ever to receive an Ophir Award nomination for Best Actress.

Strashko was born in Dnipropetrovsk, Ukraine, and from the age of two raised in Ramat Gan, Israel. She currently resides in Tel Aviv.

References

External links

1992 births
Israeli film actresses
Israeli female models
Israeli LGBT actors
Israeli transgender people
Transgender actresses
Transgender models
Living people
Ukrainian emigrants to Israel
Actresses from Tel Aviv
Big Brother (franchise) contestants